Trent James McClenahan (born 4 February 1985) is an Australian footballer who last played for Rockdale City Suns FC.
McClenahan has been capped for the Olyroos and represented Australia at the Beijing Olympics.

Club career
He was born in Chipping Norton, New South Wales and was a student at Westfields Sports High School, playing for Chipping Norton FC, Bankstown, Sydney Olympic, Parramatta Power and captaining NSW at all youth levels.

West Ham United
At the age of 16, he left Australia and signed for West Ham United on a 3 yr deal after impressing in trials. After rising through the ranks made his league debut, aged 19, against Crewe Alexandra in August 2004, the first of three first team appearances for the club, achieving promotion to the Premier League. He then went on to signing a 2-year extension, before leaving for more playing opportunities. After his loan spell away from West Ham United, McClenahan left along with six players.

MK Dons
He went out on loan to Milton Keynes Dons in March 2005, which was extended for the duration of the 2005–06 season. In all he made over 40 first team appearances for MK Dons.

Hereford United
McClenahan signed for Hereford United in August 2006. McClenahan was previously linked with a Scottish move to Kilmarnock. On the opening game of the season, McClenahan made his debut, coming on as a substitute, in a 3–0 loss against Barnet. In the second round of the League Cup on 19 September 2006, he received a red card in a 76th minutes in a 3–1 loss against Leicester City. He settled into the first team in the right-back position, and despite being in competition for the position with Simon Travis, went on to make 30 first team appearances scoring once, against Notts County on 28 January 2007. He was in and out of the Hereford side in the early part of the 2007–08 season due to his international commitments, but managed to score his second goal for the club against Lincoln City. Thereafter he featured in every first team match as Hereford gained promotion to League One.

He was offered a new contract, but declined.

Hamilton Academical
McClenahan signed for Scottish side Hamilton Academical on 19 September 2008 on a one-year contract. Eight days later, he made his debut for 'Accies', setting up a goal for opposition goalkeeper Bobby Olejnik, who scored an own-goal in a 4–1 loss against Falkirk and also set up a goal for Richard Offiong in a 2–1 loss against Celtic on 16 November 2008 Since making his debut, McClenahan went on to become a fan favourite and regular part of the first team at Hamilton.

In his two-years spell at Hamilton, he went on to make 50 appearances for the club in the Scottish Premier League helping the club to its highest finish in the SPL, 7th. He left the club at the end of the 2009/10 season after failing to agree a new contract.

Scunthorpe United
After playing in Scunthorpe's 4–2 penalty victory against Grimbsy in the Lincolnshire Cup, McClenahan was offered a contract by Iron boss Nigel Adkins, allowing him to be in contention for a place for Scunthorpe's first game away at Reading on 7 August. But only stayed on the bench, without coming on.

Nigel Adkins left the club weeks later, accepting the job at Southampton. With the change of manager, McClenahan went on to only make one appearance in the English Championship.

He was also called up to a National Team Training Camp by Holger Osieck during his time at Scunthorpe.

Perth Glory
On 14 November 2011, it was announced he had signed for A-League outfit Perth Glory on an 8-week injury replacement contract due to the injury of Scott Neville.

Central Coast Mariners
On 29 February 2012, he was added to the A-League outfit Central Coast Mariners for their Asian Champions League campaign where he made 1 start against Seongnam Ilhwa Chunma and a further 2 substitute appearances in the ACL. McClenahan was also a part of the A-League squad that went on to win the A-League Premiership: 2011–12.

Sydney FC
On 10 August 2012, McClenahan was signed to a 1-year deal with Sydney FC. On the opening game of the season on 6 October 2012, McClenahan made his debut in a 2–0 loss against Wellington Phoenix. He was joined in the side by high-profile players Alessandro Del Piero, Brett Emerton, Lucas Neill and Jason Culina.

International career

McClenahan captained the Australia U20 side and was part of the squad for the 2005 FIFA World Youth Championship and played in all 3 games.

He was then called up into the Australia U23 squad where he made 18 appearances. He featured in the Australian team that reached the final of the Intercontinental Cup. He was selected for the Olympics in Beijing and featured in all 3 games during the tournament.

Australia coach Graham Arnold selected McClenahan in a squad for the international friendly against Ghana Football Association in London on 14 November 2006.

McClenahan was also called up to an Australia training camp in 2011 by coach Holger Osieck during the early stages of his reign.

Career statistics

References

External links
Hamilton Academical profile
OzFootball profile

1985 births
Living people
People from New South Wales
Australian soccer players
Australian expatriate soccer players
Australian expatriate sportspeople in England
Olympic soccer players of Australia
Footballers at the 2008 Summer Olympics
English Football League players
Scottish Premier League players
Hamilton Academical F.C. players
Hereford United F.C. players
Milton Keynes Dons F.C. players
Parramatta Power players
Perth Glory FC players
Central Coast Mariners FC players
Rockdale Ilinden FC players
Scunthorpe United F.C. players
West Ham United F.C. players
Expatriate footballers in England
Expatriate footballers in Scotland
Sydney FC players
Trent McClenahan
Expatriate footballers in Thailand
Association football defenders
National Premier Leagues players